Crataegus pycnoloba is a species of hawthorn in the Rosaceae family. It is native to the mountains of the northern and central Peloponnesus  of Greece. The plant is a shrub or rarely a small tree. The fruit are red or dark reddish brown when immature, but later develop a yellow background colour.

See also 
 List of hawthorn species with yellow fruit

References 

pycnoloba
Taxa named by Pierre Edmond Boissier
Taxa named by Theodor von Heldreich
Flora of Greece